Anna "Annie" Hübler (2 January 1885 – 5 July 1976) was a German pair skater, born in Munich. She was an Olympic champion and two-time World champion with skating partner Heinrich Burger.

Hübler and Burger were the first World champions and the first Olympic champions in pairs figure skating. They never became European champions, because the European championships did not include a pairs competition until 1930.

They skated for the club Münchener EV (Munich EV).

Hübler was the first female German Olympic champion. (The first woman winning an Olympic medal for Germany was the single skater Elsa Rendschmidt. She won silver in 1908.)

After retiring from figure skating, Hübler became a singer and actress. She later owned a department store.

Results
(pairs with Heinrich Burger)

References

Further reading
 Hines, James. Historical Dictionary of Figure Skating. Scarecrow Press, 2011, Lanham. .

External links

 

1885 births
Sportspeople from Munich
German female pair skaters
Figure skaters at the 1908 Summer Olympics
Olympic figure skaters of Germany
1976 deaths
Olympic gold medalists for Germany
Olympic medalists in figure skating
World Figure Skating Championships medalists
Officers Crosses of the Order of Merit of the Federal Republic of Germany
Medalists at the 1908 Summer Olympics